St Briavels was an ancient hundred of Gloucestershire, England.  It comprised the extra-parochial area of the Forest of Dean, and the ancient parishes of
Abenhall
English Bicknor
St Briavels
Littledean
Flaxley
Hewelsfield
Mitcheldean
Newland
Ruardean
Staunton
Lea (part)

The hundred was created at some time between 1086 and 1220 to provide a structure for the administration of the Forest of Dean.  The meeting place was St Briavels Castle.

References

External links 
The National Gazetteer of Great Britain and Ireland (1868)

Hundreds of Gloucestershire
Forest of Dean